Richard Parker (born November 5, 1946) is an economist from the United States. He is a graduate of Dartmouth College and the University of Oxford, and has worked for the United Nations Development Programme. Parker co-founded Mother Jones magazine and is on the editorial board of The Nation. He wrote the books The Myth of the Middle Class, Mixed Signals: the Future of Global Television News, and John Kenneth Galbraith: His Life, His Politics, His Economics.

Parker has held Marshall, Rockefeller, Danforth, Goldsmith, and Bank of America fellowships; and is lecturer in public policy and senior fellow at the Joan Shorenstein Center on the Press, Politics and Public Policy at Harvard University's Kennedy School of Government, where he teaches courses on modern macroeconomic policy, as well as on the role of religion in American politics and public policy.

In June 2008, Parker was elected the 26th President of the liberal political advocacy group Americans for Democratic Action.

References

External links 
Richard Parker's page at the John F. Kennedy School of Government
Review by Fred Siegel of 'John Kenneth Galbraith: His Life, His Politics, His Economics'

1946 births
Living people
Dartmouth College alumni
Alumni of the University of Oxford
Harvard Kennedy School faculty
21st-century American economists